Christophe Marichez (born 12 December 1974) is a French former footballer who played as a goalkeeper.

External links

Living people
1974 births
People from Hazebrouck
Sportspeople from Nord (French department)
French footballers
Association football goalkeepers
RC Lens players
Chamois Niortais F.C. players
FC Metz players
Ligue 1 players
Ligue 2 players
Footballers from Hauts-de-France